Nyonga may refer to:
 Nyonga (planthopper), a genus of planthoppers in the family Achilidae
 Nyonga, Congo, a town in Congo DR

See also
 Bali Nyonga, a town in Cameroon